Edoardo Gorini (born 28 February 1974) is an Italian professional football manager and a former player, currently in charge as head coach of Serie B club Cittadella.

Career

Playing career
Gorini started his career at hometown club Venezia. He successively played at Serie B level with AlbinoLeffe and Cittadella, retiring in 2013 after six season with the latter.

Coaching career
Following his retirement as an active player, Gorini joined Cittadella's coaching staff, first as a technical collaborator, then as an assistant coach.

In 2021, following the departure of long-time head coach Roberto Venturato, Gorini was promoted head coach of Cittadella for the club's 2021–22 Serie B campaign.

Managerial statistics

References

External links

1968 births
Living people
Italian footballers
Serie B players
A.S. Cittadella players
Italian football managers
Serie B managers
A.S. Cittadella managers
Association football midfielders
Footballers from Venice